The City Central Library is located in Chikkadpally and it is the biggest library after state Central library with 1000 students and 
500 readers visit library every day. It works on all days (except public holidays and Mondays) from 8am to 8pm .

History 
It was established in 1960.

Facilities 
It also has an auditorium to conduct motivational speeches and inspiring lectures from dignitaries in different field of expertise.

References

Culture of Hyderabad, India
Libraries in Hyderabad, India
1960 establishments in Andhra Pradesh
Libraries established in 1960